Iceland competed at the inaugural 7 sports 2018 European Championships from 2 to 12 August 2018. It competed in 6 sports.

Medallists

Aquatics

Swimming

Men

Women

Athletics

Men 
Field events

Women
Track and road

Field events

Cycling

Mountain bike

Golf

Doubles

Foursome

Gymnastics

Men

Qualification

Individual finals

Women

Team

Triathlon

Individual

External links
 European Championships official site 

2018
Nations at the 2018 European Championships
2018 in Icelandic sport